The Magnificent Eleven is a 2013 American western film directed by Jeremy Wooding and written by John Adams, Peter Adams and Irvine Welsh. The film stars Josh O'Connor, Robert Vaughn, Joseph Millson and Irvine Welsh.

Briefly shown in Cannes in May 2012, after a brief theatrical release in March 2013 in Ireland and in May 2016 in the UK, it was released in 2013 in DVD.

Plot
A western remake of the film The Full Monty, in East End of London where "cowboys" are a football team and "Indians" run the local curry house.

The Cowboys FC, overage and overweight South London team, are sponsored by an Indian restaurant.

Cast 
 Josh O'Connor as Andy.
 Robert Vaughn as American Bob.
 Sean Pertwee as Pete.
 Joseph Millson as  Fire Chief .
 Irvine Welsh as  Disgruntled Diner.
 Keith Allen (actor) as  Dave.

References

External links
 

2013 films
English films
2013 Western (genre) films
2010s English-language films